George Renardo Thornton (born April 27, 1968 in Montgomery, Alabama) is a former American football defensive tackle in the National Football League. He played three years for the San Diego Chargers and the New York Giants. On October 14, 1993 he suffered a minor stroke which ended his career.

Thornton attended Jeff Davis High School in Montgomery, Alabama. At the University of Alabama, he was an All-SEC defensive end in 1990. He is married to Tawanna and they have a son, George Jr. and a daughter, Georvauna Tene' (deceased).

References

1968 births
Living people
Players of American football from Montgomery, Alabama
American football defensive tackles
Alabama Crimson Tide football players
San Diego Chargers players
New York Giants players
Ed Block Courage Award recipients